Upalve village is under the Phaltan Taluka, and district is Satara. It is located to the south of the Phaltan  and beside the Sitamai, from where the River Banganga started.

Villages in Satara district